Blaž is a masculine given name found in Slovenia, Croatia and Bosnia and Herzegovina. It is cognate to Blaise.

It may refer to:

 Blaž Arnič, Slovenian composer
 Blaž Bertoncelj, Slovene dancer
 Blaž Blagotinšek, Slovenian handball player
 Blaž Božič, Slovenian football player
 Blaž Brezovački, Slovenian football player
 Blaž Cof, Slovenian canoeist
 Blaž Črešnar, Slovenian basketball player
 Blaž Emeršič, Slovenian hockey player
 Blaž Furdi, Slovenian cyclist
 Blaž Gregorc, Slovenian hockey player
 Blaž Jakopič, Slovenian skier
 Blaž Janc, Slovenian handball player
 Blaž Jarc, Slovenian cyclist
 Blaž Kocen, Slovenian geographer and cartographer
 Blaž Kavčič, Slovenian tennis player
 Blaž Kavčič (politician), Slovenian politician and economist
 Blaž Kraljević, Bosnian Croat military leader
 Blaž Lenger, Croatian singer
 Blaž Lomovšek, Slovene hockey player who played for Yugoslavia
 Blaž Lorković, Croatian economist and lawyer
 Blaž Mahkovic, Slovenian basketball player
 Blaž Medvešek, Slovenian swimmer
 Blaž Mesiček, Slovenian basketball player
 Blaž Mikuž, Slovenian astronomer
 Blaž Mohar, Slovenian football player
 Blaž Puc, Slovenian football player
 Blaž Rola, Slovenian tennis player
 Blaž Samerl, Slovene politician
 Blaž Slišković, Bosnian Croat football manager and player
 Blaž Škrinjarić, Croatian notary and judge
 Blaž Trupej, Slovenian tennis player
 Blaž Vrhovec, Slovenian football player
 Blaž Vrhovnik, Slovenian ski jumper
 Blaž Zbičajnik, Slovenian football player
 Blaž Zupan, Slovenian computer scientist

See also
 Variants: Blažo, Blaže, Blaženko, Blaženka
 Surnames: Blažić, Blažević

Slovene masculine given names
Croatian masculine given names